The blue panchax or whitespot (Aplocheilus panchax) is a common freshwater fish found in a large variety of habitats due to its high adaptability. This species is native to southern Asia from Pakistan to Indonesia. It has been discovered in two hot springs in Singapore. Identified by a white-coloured spot on its head, the species can reach up to 9 cm (3.5 in) in length; it tends to keep to the surface of the water, and controls the mosquito population by feeding on their larvae.

References 

Blue panchax
Fish of Bangladesh
Fish of Singapore
Taxa named by Francis Buchanan-Hamilton
Fish described in 1822